Nerella Sharada is a women's rights activist, an Indian National Congress politician and an executive committee member of Telangana Pradesh Congress Committee (TPCC). She is state president of the women's wing of the TPCC and secretary of the All India Mahila Congress.

Early life
Nerella Sharada was born in Karimnagar district in [[telangana (ts) ].

Career
She was elected as a President of Zilla Parshad in Karimnagar. In October 2004 she was nominated as member-secretary for TPCC Ethics Committee.

In September 2018, Sharada joined protests against the BJP central government over rising fuel prices.

In February 2019, Sharada criticised the Telangana Rashtra Samithi (TRS) government for nepotism and failure to promote women into ministerial positions. In April, she claimed the state government's failures in the handling of examination results had led to student suicides.

References

Indian National Congress politicians from Andhra Pradesh
People from Karimnagar
Living people
People from Karimnagar district
Telangana district councillors
Year of birth missing (living people)